James McClendon should link here

James A. McClendon (died 1992) was a lawyer, judge, and Army officer who served in the Illinois House of Representatives. He was a Democrat.

He served in the U. S. Army. He served as a Master in Chancery. He lived in Chicago.
 
He was born in Washington, Georgia. He graduated from Fisk University and graduated with a aw degree from Northwestern University. He was first elected to the Illinois House in 1966 and served there until 1978 when he was elected to the Illinois Senate. His wife Elnora was the daughter of general Benjamin O. Davis Sr. He died in Santa Monica, California.

References

This draft is in progress as of October 18, 2022.

Illinois politicians

Year of birth missing
1992 deaths